Matilde Urrutia Cerda (30 April 1912 – 5 January 1985) was the third wife of Chilean poet Pablo Neruda, from 1966 until his death in 1973. They met in Santiago in 1946, when she was working as a physical therapist in Chile. She was the first woman in Latin America to work as a pediatric therapist. Urrutia was the inspiration behind  Neruda's later love poems beginning with Los Versos del Capitan in 1951, which the poet withheld publication until 1961 to spare the feelings of his previous wife; as well as 100 Love Sonnets which includes a beautiful dedication to her.

Neruda built a house in Santiago called "La Chascona", for Urrutia, which served as a secret love den for the two, as news that Neruda was having an affair would not have been received well with the Chilean public. In his house there is a painting given to Urrutia by Neruda depicting a two faced Urrutia with her famously long bright red hair. What is remarkable about this painting is that one face depicts the Urrutia as the singer the public knew, and the other depicting the lover Neruda knew. The painting also has a hidden image; the profile view of Neruda's face hidden in her hair, showing their continuous secret relationship.

After Neruda's death, Urrutia edited for publication his memoir, Confieso que he vivido ("I confess that I have lived"). This and other activities  brought her into conflict with the government of Augusto Pinochet which tried to suppress the memory of Neruda, an outspoken communist, from the collective consciousness.

Her own memoir, My Life with Pablo Neruda, was published posthumously in 1986.

1912 births
1985 deaths
Chilean people of Basque descent
Chilean memoirists
People from Chillán
Women memoirists
20th-century Chilean women writers
20th-century Chilean non-fiction writers
Pablo Neruda
20th-century memoirists